Gest is a surname. Notable people with the surname include:

 Alain Gest (born 1950), French politician
 David Gest (1953-2016), American television producer
 John B. Gest (1823-1907), American banker and lawyer
 Joseph Henry Gest (1859-1935), American artist and museum director
 Morris Gest (1875-1942), Jewish-American theatrical producer
 William H. Gest (1838-1912), member of the United States House of Representatives from Illinois